The Forthing T5 EVO is a compact CUV produced by Dongfeng Liuzhou Motor under the Forthing (Dongfeng Fengxing) sub-brand.

History

The Forthing T5 EVO was launched as a sportier variant of the Forthing T5 compact crossover sport utility vehicle under the Forthing brand of Dongfeng Motor Group for China, and officially debuted during the 2020 Guangzhou Auto Show in November 2020. The Forthing T5 EVO is also the first vehicle to wear the Forthing brand's freshly unveiled logo, the powerful lion badge (Jin Shi Biao, 劲狮标). The logo is in the shape of a shield with a lion graphic in the center, implying "self-confidence, fearlessness, and bravery" according to officials.

Powertrain
There are two wheel sizes available in 235/55 R19 and 235/60 R18.

Features

The Forthing T5 EVO is equipped with L2 + intelligent driving assistance systems and the future link 4.0 intelligent link system. For the standard luxury trim models, T5 EVO has developed corrosion-resistant and self-healing 2K paint offering eight kinds of personalised colors. For the interior, the T5 EVO is equipped with 37 storage spaces including various hidden hooks, door panel storage capable of containing one litre water bottles and additional storage space for mobile phones and electronics.

References

External links
Official website

Compact sport utility vehicles
Crossover sport utility vehicles
Forthing T5 EVO
Cars introduced in 2020
Front-wheel-drive vehicles
Cars of China